Gypsonoma mutabilana is a species of moth of the family Tortricidae. It is found in China (Tibet) and Russia.

References

Moths described in 1985
Eucosmini